Lawson Sibley (1836 – March 18, 1898) was an American businessman and  politician who served as  the Mayor of Springfield, Massachusetts in 1892.

Biography
Lawson Sibley was born in Barre, Massachusetts in 1836. He married Harriet Emmons Aiken in 1863, and they had two daughters. He worked in the flour and feed business.   

A Democrat, he served as county commissioner of Hampden County, Massachusetts from 1873 to 1876.

He died at his home in Springfield on March 18, 1898.

Notes

1836 births
1898 deaths
Massachusetts Democrats
Mayors of Springfield, Massachusetts
County commissioners in Massachusetts
19th-century American politicians